Reg Farrant (9 September 1920 – 6 April 2005) was an  Australian rules footballer who played with Hawthorn in the Victorian Football League (VFL).

He enlisted in the Royal Australian Air Force and made the rank of Flying Officer. On August 7 1945 the Beaufighter he was a member of crew was shot down over the island of Borneo. He suffered a leg injury. Aided by his Flight Lt. Vernon Sims the pair received help by local chinese villagers to evade the Japanese soldiers and managed to get to Miri which was an Australian base.

Notes

External links 

1920 births
2005 deaths
Australian rules footballers from Victoria (Australia)
Hawthorn Football Club players
Australian aviators
Aviators from Melbourne
Royal Australian Air Force officers
Royal Australian Air Force personnel of World War II
Victims of aviation accidents or incidents in 1945